Pila is a small town in Buenos Aires Province, Argentina. It is the administrative centre for Pila Partido.

External links

Populated places in Buenos Aires Province